Joe D. Fugate, Sr. is a writer and game designer who has written on model railroading topics and has worked on role-playing games. Fugate is the founder and publisher of Model Railroad Hobbyist magazine (MRH).

Career
Editors Gary Thomas and Joe D. Fugate, Sr. founded Digest Group Publications (DGP) in 1986 as a business that they ran part-time while working at other jobs. Fugate's work in the company's digest-sized magazine The Traveller's Digest got the attention of Marc Miller at Game Designers' Workshop, who invited Fugate and Thomas to expand and revise the material for GDW; the result was Book 8: Robots (1986) for Traveller, which would be the start of a working relationship between the two companies that lasted several years. In 1993, Fugate announced in The MegaTraveller Journal #4 that DGP was leaving Traveller behind, saying that they had a "puppet on a string relationship" with GDW.

Roger Sanger, a fan of Traveller, came to Fugate's door one morning late in 1994, looking to buy books from Digest Group Publications; Sanger bought some of the remaining backstock at that time, as Fugate was still paying back creditors and holding onto the boxes of remaining DGP items that he owned. Over the next nine months Sanger came to an agreement whereby he paid Fugate a few thousand dollars for the remaining assets of DGP, including copyrights and trademarks; Fugate would keep the larger debts, but Sanger would take care of the smaller debts. Fugate agreed to this arrangement, and Sanger became owner of DGP.

Fugate later ran a model railroad site, and produced professional how-to videos for Model Railroader magazine. He produced these videos from 2005-2007.

In July 2008, Joe D. Fugate, Sr. started Model Railroad Hobbyist magazine  and an associated website to go with the magazine. Model Railroad Hobbyist magazine (MRH) Issue 01 was published January 2009. Model Railroad Hobbyist magazine (MRH) is a digital publication in the same genre as * Model Railroader   and * Railroad Model Craftsman 

Model Railroad Hobbyist magazine started as a quarterly publication in 2009, went to bimonthly in 2010, and since 2011 has been a monthly publication running over 100 pages per issue. As of 2015, MRH reports that it has about 30,000 subscribers.

References

External links
 
 
 Joe Fugate's Siskiyou Line 
 Model Railroad Hobbyist Magazine Website

American publishers (people)
Living people
Role-playing game designers
Year of birth missing (living people)